The 2006 NCAA Division II women's basketball tournament was the 25th annual tournament hosted by the NCAA to determine the national champion of Division II women's  collegiate basketball in the United States.

Grand Valley State defeated American International in the championship game, 58–52, to claim the Lakers' first NCAA Division II national title.

For the second consecutive year, the championship rounds were contested at the Summit Arena in Hot Springs, Arkansas.

Regionals

East - Charleston, West Virginia
Location: Eddie King Gym Host: University of Charleston

Great Lakes - Springfield, Missouri
Location: Weiser Gymnasium Host: Drury University

North Central - Grand Forks, North Dakota
Location: Betty Engelstad Sioux Center Host: University of North Dakota

Northeast - New Haven, Connecticut
Location: James W. Moore Fieldhouse Host: Southern Connecticut State University

South - Arkadelphia, Arkansas
Location: Wells Center Host: Henderson State University

South Atlantic - Raleigh, North Carolina
Location: Spaulding Gym Host: Shaw University

South Central - Topeka, Kansas
Location: Lee Arena Host: Washburn University

West - Bellingham, Washington
Location: Sam Carver Gymnasium Host: Western Washington University

Elite Eight - Hot Springs, Arkansas
Location: Summit Arena Hosts: Henderson State University and Hot Springs Convention Center

All-tournament team
 Julia Braseth, Grand Valley State
 Niki Reams, Grand Valley State
 Krystal Pressley, American International
 Sharmion Selman, American International
 Michelle Stueve, Emporia State

See also
 2006 NCAA Division I women's basketball tournament
 2006 NCAA Division III women's basketball tournament
 2006 NAIA Division I women's basketball tournament
 2006 NAIA Division II women's basketball tournament
 2006 NCAA Division II men's basketball tournament

References
 2006 NCAA Division II women's basketball tournament jonfmorse.com

 
NCAA Division II women's basketball tournament
2006 in sports in Arkansas